Abu Abd Allah Mohammed al-Tayyib ibn Abd al-Majid ibn Abd as-Salam Ibn Kiran al-Fasi (1172/1758-1227/1812) was a Moroccan, religious scholar from Fes. He also played an active political role.

Ibn Kiran is the author of Risala bn Saud, a response, written at the request of the sultan mulay Slimane, to the manifesto of the Wahhabis. He has written several commentaries, including one on al-Ghazali's Ihya and another on the Alfiyya of Ibn Malik. He also wrote Iqd nafais alla-ali fi tahrik al-himam al-awali, a popular religious work. Ibn Kiran was a teacher at Al-Qarawiyyin University and the teacher of Ahmad Ibn Idris Al-Fasi and Muhammad ibn Ali as-Senussi.

References

Moroccan writers
1758 births
1812 deaths
People from Fez, Morocco
Moroccan scholars
18th-century Moroccan people
19th-century Moroccan people